Al Jazeera Mubasher (AJM) is a public affairs television network launched by Al Jazeera Media Network originally on April 15, 2005. As such, it is an Arabic channel based in Doha, Qatar that broadcasts conferences and other events live without editing or commentary, using subtitles when translation is needed. The channel is also sometimes referred to as Al Jazeera Live, as Mubasher is an Arabic word for Live (as in live broadcast) and Al-‘Amma is Arabic for General. The channel was formerly called just Al Jazeera Mubasher.

Al Jazeera Mubasher Al-‘Amma is the first channel of its kind in the Arab world and is similar to the U.S. channel C-SPAN and UK channel BBC Parliament. The channel also has a live stream of its broadcast on its website.

In 2014, the channel underwent a graphics upgrade as part of Al Jazeera Media Networks graphics upgrade across the company.

Launched in April 2005, Al Jazeera Mubasher is the first Middle Eastern 24-hour live news and events channel. The channel is dedicated to giving viewers real-time footage of global and regional events.

The channel has remote feeds and on-the-ground cameras broadcasting political gatherings, press conferences, discussions, and meetings, broadcasting the latest on political, social, cultural and economic affairs. The channel feed mainly provides live and uncut livestream.

On December 20, 2014 it was announced that Al Jazeera Media Network would coalesce both Al Jazeera Mubasher and the temporarily suspended Al Jazeera Mubasher Misr in to a new combined channel called Al Jazeera Al-‘Amma (AJMG) or Al Jazeera Live General.

The new Al Jazeera Mubasher Al-‘Amma  reports live events from all over the globe simultaneously with round-the-clock analysis. The channel’s focus is to ensure interaction between viewers and unfolding events. The channel is built to serve as an open space for viewers to air their views rather than them simply receiving information. The output rely much on viewer suggestions rather than a traditional pattern of fixed transmission grid.

Egyptian channel
A similar channel called Al Jazeera Mubasher Misr (AJMM) similar to its original sister channel minus some commentary operated in Egypt based in Cairo from 2011 to 2014. The channel functioned similar to its main counterpart but was shut down by the Egyptian government after the removal of Mohamed Morsi due to its pro-Brotherhood slant. The channel's staff were arrested but later released.

In the period from 2013 until its suspension it broadcast from Al Jazeera's Doha  headquarters running video brought in through other sources such as YouTube and Reuters and press conferences taped from other news organizations in the country.

Al Jazeera Mubasher Misr has meanwhile temporarily ceased broadcasting until such time as necessary permits are issued for its return to Cairo in coordination with the Egyptian authorities. Al Jazeera Mubasher Al‘Amma is therefore transmitting on the frequencies of both Al Jazeera Mubasher and Al Jazeera Mubasher Misr.

References

External links
 Al Jazeera Mubasher Al-‘Amma
 Al Jazeera 
 
 Al Jazeera Mubasher at Lyngsat

Al Jazeera
Legislature broadcasters
Television channels and stations established in 2005
Arabic-language television stations